A lolly cake or lolly log is a New Zealand cake or confectionery that features "lollies" (candy) as a key ingredient.

The exact origins of this cake are unknown. Lolly cakes are known to have been consumed in the 1940s, but were not commonly available until the 1960s in supermarkets.

The cake is similar to the "Chocolate salami" and to "Fifteens".

Recipe 
Traditionally, Explorer lollies (known as Eskimo lollies prior to March 2021) or fruit puffs are used, which are like firm, but soft and chewy, marshmallows. Chopped lollies are added to the base mixture, which consists of crushed plain malt biscuits combined with melted butter and sweetened condensed milk. The mixture is usually pressed into a log shape and rolled in coconut, and then refrigerated until set and sliced. Other ingredients can be added or substituted. Lolly cakes are very similar to the Northern Ireland traybake confections known as fifteens.

Availability  

Lolly cakes can be found in most New Zealand supermarkets, bakeries and some dairies and petrol stations.

In July 2021, Canterbury cookie company Cookie Time introduced a lolly cake biscuit in supermarkets and other retailers. Night 'n Day was the first retailer to sell it.

References

New Zealand cuisine
New Zealand desserts
No bake cakes